Arjun Singh (5 November 1930 – 4 March 2011) was an Indian politician from the Indian National Congress, who served twice as the Chief Minister of Madhya Pradesh in the 1980s. He also served twice as the Union Minister of Human Resource Development, in the Manmohan Singh and P. V. Narasimha Rao ministries.

Early life
Arjun Singh was the son of Shiv Bahadur Singh, a jagirdar and the 26th Rao of Churhat thikana, and an INC politician.

Career

Arjun Singh was first elected to the Madhya Pradesh Legislative Assembly in 1957 from Majholi as an independent candidate. He joined the Indian National Congress in 1960. He was re-elected from Majholi in 1962 and became a minister in the INC government of Dwarka Prasad Mishra.

In 1967, he lost the election from Churhat due to a fallout with the then chief minister Dwarka Prasad Mishra. However, he won a bypoll in the same year from Umaria. He was elected from Sidhi in 1972 and became a minister in the INC government of Prakash Chandra Sethi.

In 1977, he was elected from Churhat and became the Leader of Opposition in the Madhya Pradesh Legislative Assembly. In 1980, when INC achieved a simple majority in the assembly, he won from Churhat and became the Chief Minister of Madhya Pradesh, despite the presence of strong contenders such as Sethi, Vidya Charan Shukla and Shiv Bhanu Singh Solanki.

His five year term was marked by the Bhopal Gas Tragedy.

He led the INC to victory in 1985, yet again winning from Churhat, but was forced to resign as Chief Minister after just one day due to differences with Sriniwas Tiwari. Motilal Vora succeeded him as Chief Minister.

He resigned his Madhya Pradesh assembly seat and was appointed Governor of Punjab in 1985. He worked for the implementation of the Rajiv-Longowal Accord for peace in Punjab. However, after eight months, he resigned as Governor and became Minister of Commerce in the Rajiv Gandhi cabinet. He was elected to the Lok Sabha from South Delhi in a bypoll in 1985, necessitated by the assassination of the sitting MP Lalit Maken.He was appointed as First Vice President of Indian National Congress by Rajiv Gandhi.

In 1986, he resigned the Commerce ministry and was appointed Minister of Communications. He held this post till 1988 when he returned to the Government of Madhya Pradesh and again became Chief Minister of the state. He resigned his Lok Sabha seat and won a bypoll to the Madhya Pradesh Legislative Assembly from Kharsia in 1988. However, he resigned as Chief Minister in 1989 owing to the Churhat lottery scam, and was succeeded by Motilal Vora. He won in 1990 from Churhat.

In 1991, he won from Satna. He resigned his assembly seat and harboured ambitions of becoming Prime Minister after the assassination of Rajiv Gandhi.

However, P. V. Narasimha Rao became Prime Minister and Singh was appointed the Minister of Human Resource Development. He publicly expressed discontent with the Prime Minister PV Narasimha Rao after the Babri Masjid demolition. He resigned as Minister of Human Resource Development in 1994.

In 1996, he rebelled against the INC leadership and formed the All India Indira Congress (Tiwari) along with Narayan Dutt Tiwari. However, he lost in 1996 from Satna.

Later, he returned to INC after the emergence of Sonia Gandhi. He lost in 1998 from Narmadapuram.

He was elected to the Rajya Sabha in 2000 from Madhya Pradesh, and was re-elected in 2006. He was awarded the Outstanding Parliamentarian Award in 2000. He served as Minister of Human Resource Development from 2004 to 2009 in the Manmohan Singh cabinet.

Controversies

Bhopal Incident
Arjun Singh was the Chief Minister of Madhya Pradesh when the deadly gas leak from the Union Carbide factory occurred. It is widely alleged that on the fateful night between 2 and 3 December 1984, when the gas leak occurred, Arjun Singh fled to his Kerwa Dam Palace (outside Bhopal) to save himself from deadly effects of leaked gas and was not available to manage the crisis or lead the administration.

Subsequently, the Arjun Singh government's mishandling was criticised by the court in the verdict on the Bhopal disaster as pronounced by the Chief Judicial Magistrate, Bhopal on 7 June 2010. The media raised serious questions about his role in the release of Warren Anderson.

In particular, the pilot of the aircraft in which Warren Anderson flew out of India after the gas leak, has recorded that the final sanction to permit the flight came from Arjun Singh's office.

Churhat Lottery case and Kerwa Dam palace
While Chief Minister of Madhya Pradesh, Singh was involved in the scandal known as the Churhat Lottery case. The Churhat Children Welfare Society was floated in 1982 by relatives of Singh, and permitted to raise funds via lottery, and also given tax relief as a charity. However, there were widespread allegations that substantial sums of money were siphoned off from donations and used to construct the lavish Kerwa Dam Palace near Bhopal.  The donations to the society included a Rs 150,000 donation from Union Carbide, whose chief Warren Anderson was permitted to leave the country after the gas leak, allegedly by Arjun Singh's office.

At a public litigation hearing, the Madhya Pradesh High Court observed that "Arjun Singh owed an explanation to the nation about the costs and sources of construction of the palatial mansion in Bhopal". While Singh had claimed the value of the palace was Rs 1.8 million, the IT Department estimated the cost at above Rs one crore.
However, a one-judge commission investigating the scandal gave a clean chit to Arjun Singh. The case was re-opened however, after the Jain Hawala case, and Singh was asked to submit fresh re-estimates of the palace cost.
In court, the case was argued by Kapil Sibal and the order for re-examination was squashed on the grounds that it had been issued in a haste and "had not applied his mind".

Other controversies
After the Mumbai train bombings of 2006, he reportedly quoted at a Cabinet meeting the statements of a former judge of the Maharashtra High Court that an earlier attempt on the headquarters of the Hindu revivalist Rashtriya Swayamsevak Sangh in Nagpur had been a plot set into motion by the Sangh itself. This followed his denouncement of the Ekal Vidyalayas, one-teacher schools run for the benefit of the tribals of India by the Vishwa Hindu Parishad., as communal.

A case under the Anti-Dowry Act was registered against Arjun Singh in 2007. The then Uttar Pradesh government had decided to seek CBI inquiry into dowry harassment case.

Arjun Singh was accused of irregularities and corruption in the grant of "Deemed University" status to private for-profit educational institutions which did not meet requisite educational standards, during his tenure as Minister for Human Resources Development. The Government of India initiated proceedings to repeal the "Deemed University" status of 44 such institutions in January 2010.

Death
Singh died on 4 March 2011, at the age of 80. He had been admitted in Delhi's All India Institute of Medical Sciences with chest pain and neurological problems, and died of a heart attack. He was cremated at his home town of Churhat.

Family
Arjun Singh's son Ajay Singh aka Rahul Bhaiya is an INC politician and former Leader of Opposition in the Madhya Pradesh Legislative Assembly. His grandson is Arunoday Singh, a Bollywood actor.

Another grandson of his, Yuvaraja Aishwarya Singh of Singrauli is married to Devyani Rana, great-granddaughter of Mohan Shamsher Jang Bahadur Rana, the last Shree Teen Maharaja of Nepal. Devyani’s father- His Highness Shree Teen Maharaja Pashupati Shamsher Jang Bahadur Rana is the titular Shree Teen Maharaja of Nepal.

Positions held
	1957 - 1985 Member, Madhya Pradesh Legislative Assembly 
	1963 - 1967 Minister of State for Agriculture, General Administration Department (GAD) and Information & Public Relations, Government of Madhya Pradesh
	1967 Minister of Planning and Development, Government of Madhya Pradesh
	1972 - 1977 Minister of Education, Government of Madhya Pradesh
	1977 - 1980 Leader of Opposition, Madhya Pradesh Legislative Assembly
	1980 - 1985 Chief Minister of Madhya Pradesh
	1985 - 1985 Governor of Punjab
	1985 - 1988 Member of Parliament, Lok Sabha
   1985 - 1986 Minister of Commerce, Government of India
   1986 - 1988 Minister of Communications, Government of India
	1988 - 1991 Member, Madhya Pradesh Legislative Assembly
	1988 - 1989 Chief Minister of Madhya Pradesh
	1991 - 1996 Member of Parliament, Lok Sabha
	1991 - 1994 Minister of Human Resource Development, Government of India
	2000 - 2011 Member of Parliament, Rajya Sabha
	2000 - 2004 Member, Consultative Committee for the Ministry of Home Affairs
	2001 - 2004 Member, Committee on Rules
	2002 - 2004 Chairman, Parliamentary Standing Committee on Purposes Committee
	2004 - 2009 Minister of Human Resource Development, Government of India

Elections contested
   1957 - Won from Majholi (IND)
   1962 - Won from Majholi (INC)
   1967 - Lost from Churhat (INC)
   1967 - Won Madhya Pradesh Legislative Assembly bypoll from Umaria (INC)
   1972 - Won from Sidhi (INC)
   1977 - Won from Churhat (INC)
    1980 - Won from Churhat (INC)
   1985 - Won from Churhat (INC)
   1985 - Won Lok Sabha bypoll from South Delhi (IND)
   1988 - Won Madhya Pradesh Legislative Assembly bypoll from Kharsia (INC)
   1990 - Won from Churhat (INC)
   1991 - Won from Satna (INC)
	1996 - Lost from Satna (AIICT)
	1998 - Lost from Hoshangabad (INC)
   2000 - Won Rajya Sabha election from Madhya Pradesh (INC)
   2006 - Won Rajya Sabha election from Madhya Pradesh (INC)

See also
 2006 Indian anti-reservation protests
 Reservation in India
 Forward caste

References

External links
HRD Ministry's website
 Arjun singh's recent interview with Karan Thapar on reservation issue
 Hindustan Times : Arjun Singh, always in the race but never the king

1930 births
2011 deaths
People from Sidhi
University of Allahabad alumni
Indian National Congress politicians
All India Indira Congress (Tiwari) politicians
Madhya Pradesh MLAs 1957–1962
Madhya Pradesh MLAs 1962–1967
Madhya Pradesh MLAs 1967–1972
Madhya Pradesh MLAs 1972–1977
Madhya Pradesh MLAs 1977–1980
Madhya Pradesh MLAs 1980–1985
Madhya Pradesh MLAs 1985–1990
Madhya Pradesh MLAs 1990–1992
Chief Ministers of Madhya Pradesh
Leaders of the Opposition in Madhya Pradesh
Chief ministers from Indian National Congress
Governors of Punjab, India
India MPs 1984–1989
Lok Sabha members from Delhi
India MPs 1991–1996
Lok Sabha members from Madhya Pradesh
Rajya Sabha members from Madhya Pradesh
Leaders of the Lok Sabha
Members of the Cabinet of India
Education Ministers of India
Commerce and Industry Ministers of India